César Curiel (born October 12, 1949) is a retired Mexican Luchador or professional wrestler who was active in the 1970s, 1980s and 1990s. Curiel has three sons who are currently wrestling, Neutron, Steel Man and Cat Man.

Early in Curiel's career, on December 25, 1979, he was involved in the death of wrestler José Vincent Ramos Estrada, known to the wrestling world under the ring name Sangre India. Curiel was teaming with El Vengador while Sangre India was teaming with Leo Lopez. During the match Curiel executed a drop kick, a move that supposed to knocked Sangre India out of the ring to the floor. During the fall to the floor Estrada's head and neck struck the apron before he tumbled uncontrollably to the ground. Estrada died shortly after the fall. Subsequently, Lucha magazines ran a storyline that claimed that "it was dangerous to wrestle César Curiel", even though he was not at fault. In subsequent years magazines stopped claiming that Curiel was in any way responsible for the death. It took a couple of years after the death for Curiel to truly shake the image of being "the most dangerous luchador". On April 2, 1982, Curiel defeated El Faraón to win the NWA World Middleweight Championship. Curiel's reign with the title lasted until October 25, 1982, when he lost the title to El Satánico. In the mid-1980s Curiel began wrestling as the enmascarado (masked) character Quazar until June 24, 1988, when he lost a Lucha de Apuesta (bet match) to Mogur and had to unmask.

Championships and accomplishments
Empresa Mexicana de Lucha Libre
NWA World Middleweight Championship (1 time)

Luchas de Apuestas record

References

1949 births
Living people
Mexican male professional wrestlers
20th-century professional wrestlers
NWA World Middleweight Champions